The Musahiban (mus-hi-been; the name derives from Persian  Muṣāḥib, meaning "courtier" or "aide de camp") are a Mohammadzai family who founded the Afghan Barakzai dynasty, and members of the royal lineage that ruled Afghanistan as emir, king or president from 1823 to 1978. They descend from Sultan Mohammad Khan Telai (1795–1861) and his older brother Emir Dost Mohammad Khan (1792-1863), and were the last rulers of the Mohammadzai dynasty before being overthrown in the Saur Revolution in April 1978.

Name and origins
The family are descendants of Sultan Mohammad Khan (1795–1861), nicknamed "Telai" which means "possessor of gold" or "golden" (a nickname he was given because of his wealth and love of fine clothing), and his older brother was Dost Mohammad Khan who gained control of Afghanistan and became its ruler. Telai had a son named Yahya and Yahya's son, Sardar Mohammad Yusuf Khan, founded the Yahya-khel clan which was later named the Musahiban. According to Amin Saikal, "by 1905, Yossef and his brother, Asef, became the Amir's Musahiban-e Khas (Attendants par Excellence), from which originated the tribe name Musahiban".

Policies
The Musahiban have historically been known for a step-by-step, culturally progressive and tribally sensitive, evolution for the modernization and opening up of Afghanistan in contrast to the often more radically accelerated strategies promoted in the past.

References

Pashtun dynasties
Emirate of Afghanistan
Kingdom of Afghanistan
19th-century Afghan politicians
20th-century Afghan politicians